KTDO (channel 48) is a television station licensed to Las Cruces, New Mexico, United States, broadcasting the Spanish-language Telemundo network to the El Paso, Texas area. Owned and operated by NBCUniversal's Telemundo Station Group, the station has studios on Carnegie Avenue in El Paso, and its transmitter is located atop the Franklin Mountains on the El Paso city limits.

History

KASK-TV
The station first signed on the air November 18, 1984, as KASK-TV; it originally operated as an English-language independent station. The TV station was an outgrowth of KASK-FM (103.1).

KZIA
KASK-TV went off the air in October 1987 when it was bought by Bayport Communications. Bayport was approved to relocate the tower to a new site near Anthony, New Mexico, and increase power from 74,000 watts to the maximum 5 million. Channel 48 was sold to Robert Muñoz and reemerged on June 13, 1990, as KZIA. The station was added to the El Paso cable system in 1991. Lee Enterprises bought the station in 1993 for $440,000, after a separate $900,000 sale fell through the year prior. "Z48" became a charter affiliate of the United Paramount Network (UPN) upon the network's launch on January 16, 1995.

Change to Telemundo
In 1997, the station's calls were changed to KMAZ ahead of a January 16, 1998, change to Telemundo and Spanish-language programming. The change was made to improve the station's financial position and because management felt the market was ready for a second Spanish-language station on the United States side of the border.
In 2001, the station's call letters were changed to KTYO. In 2004, the station was purchased by the Arlington, Virginia-based ZGS Group for $11.8 million; ZGS subsequently converted the station into a Spanish-language outlet as the market's Telemundo affiliate and changed its call letters to KTDO. As a result of the switch, UPN (which ceased operations in September 2006 and merged its programming with competing network The WB as part of a joint venture between CBS Corporation and Time Warner to form The CW) did not have a full-time affiliate in the El Paso market for the remainder of the network's run, with its programming being relegated to a secondary affiliation on KKWB (channel 65, now KTFN) until it switched to TeleFutura in January 2002.

On December 4, 2017, NBCUniversal's Telemundo Station Group announced its purchase of ZGS' television stations, including KTDO. The sale was completed on February 1, 2018.

News operation
KTDO presently broadcasts 12 hours of locally produced newscasts each week (with two hours each weekday and one hour each on Saturdays and Sundays).

On November 16, 2010, KTDO launched a news department, with half-hour Spanish-language newscasts airing at 5:00 and 10:00 p.m., under the title Telenoticias El Paso; with the launch, it became the first Spanish-language television station in the El Paso market to broadcast its local newscasts in high definition.

On June 11, 2018, the station launched newscasts at 4 and 4:30 p.m., adding to the already established 5 p.m. newscast. With this expansion, KTDO has more hours of local news than any other Spanish-language station in El Paso.

Previous local newscasts
KASK-TV had launched with a local news operation, airing a 5-minute news brief at 7 p.m. and a main news at 10 p.m.

As KZIA-TV, the station carried a 9 p.m. local newscast, "Newswatch 48", hosted by former KDBC-TV anchor Bill Mitchell, and a replay of KDBC's 6 p.m. newscast at 9:30 p.m. In 1991, channel 48 began carrying by microwave link all of KOB-TV's local newscasts live from Albuquerque in a first-of-its-kind arrangement. When Lee Enterprises—owner of KRQE-TV—bought the station in 1993, the station shifted to carrying that station's news, though Lee planned to begin local newscasts in Las Cruces.

Technical information

Subchannels
The station's digital signal is multiplexed:

Analog-to-digital conversion
KTDO shut down its analog signal, over UHF channel 48, on June 12, 2009, the official date in which full-power television stations in the United States transitioned from analog to digital broadcasts under federal mandate. The station's digital signal remained on its pre-transition UHF channel 47. Through the use of PSIP, digital television receivers display the station's virtual channel as its former UHF analog channel 48.

Former translator
KTDO's main channel was also seen in analog in El Paso proper via low-power translator KTDO-LP on channel 48, mainly to allow viewers in El Paso and on the Mexican side of the market to continue to watch the station over-the-air. With the sale to NBCUniversal and Mexico's digital transition having been completed, the license for KTDO-LP was returned to the Federal Communications Commission (FCC) on November 30, 2018, and was formally canceled on December 21.

References

External links

Telemundo network affiliates
Television channels and stations established in 1984
TDO
TDO
1984 establishments in New Mexico
Cozi TV affiliates
TeleXitos affiliates
LX (TV network) affiliates